63rd Division may refer to:

 Infantry divisions 
63rd Infantry Division CireneItalian Army (Second World War)
63rd Rifle Division (Soviet Union)
63rd Guards Rifle Division (Soviet Union)
63rd Division (Spain)
63rd (2nd Northumbrian) DivisionBritish, World War I
63rd (Royal Naval) DivisionBritish, World War I
63rd Infantry Division (United States)
63rd Division (Imperial Japanese Army)

 Cavalry divisions 
 63rd Cavalry Division (Soviet Union)

 Armoured divisions 
 63rd Tank Division (Soviet Union)

See also 
 63rd Regiment (disambiguation)